Cruso (also Crusoe) is an unincorporated community in Haywood County, North Carolina, United States. 

Cruso is near Pisgah National Forest.

History
Prior to European colonization, the area that is now Cruso was inhabited by the Cherokee people and other Indigenous peoples for thousands of years. The Cherokee in Western North Carolina are known as the Eastern Band of Cherokee Indians, a federally recognized tribe.

On August 17, 2021, six people died as a result from flooding from Tropical Storm Fred. As of June 2022, there are still piles of debris in and around Cruso.

Notes

Unincorporated communities in Haywood County, North Carolina
Unincorporated communities in North Carolina